The 1924–25 Swiss International Ice Hockey Championship was the 10th edition of the international ice hockey championship in Switzerland. HC Rosey Gstaad won the championship by defeating HC Davos in the final.

First round

Eastern Series

Western Series

Final 
 HC Davos - HC Rosey Gstaad 1:2

External links 
Swiss Ice Hockey Federation – All-time results

Inter
Swiss International Ice Hockey Championship seasons